Bogoriellaceae is an Actinomycete family.

Phylogeny
The currently accepted taxonomy is based on the List of Prokaryotic names with Standing in Nomenclature (LPSN) and National Center for Biotechnology Information (NCBI)
and the phylogeny is based on 16S rRNA-based LTP release 106 by The All-Species Living Tree Project:

References

Micrococcales
Soil biology